Algona Municipal Airport  is a public airport located two miles (3 km) west of the central business district of Algona, a city in Kossuth County, Iowa, United States. It is owned by the City of Algona.

Although most U.S. airports use the same three-letter location identifier for the FAA and IATA, Algona Municipal is assigned AXA by the FAA and AXG by the IATA (which assigned AXA to Wallblake Airport in Anguilla).

Facilities and aircraft 
For the 12-month period ending November 28, 2005, the airport had 6,975 aircraft operations, an average of 19 per day, all of which were general aviation.

References

External links 
 Algona Municipal (AXA) at Iowa DOT Office of Aviation

Airports in Iowa
Transportation buildings and structures in Kossuth County, Iowa